Mohammad Hafis bin Saperi (born 11 November 1994) is Malaysian footballer who plays for Kuching City as a midfielder.

His elder brother Shahrol Saperi is former footballer, now is currently work as fitness coach for Sarawak FA U-19 team.

Career statistics

Club

References

External links
 

1994 births
Living people
Malaysian footballers
Sarawak FA players
Kuching City F.C. players
Malaysia Premier League players
Malaysia Super League players
Association football midfielders